was a Japanese manga artist known for the popular Crayon Shin-chan series. He was born in Shizuoka City, Shizuoka Prefecture, Japan.

Personal life
In 1977, he graduated from Saitama Kasukabe technical high school (埼玉県立春日部工業高等学校). After graduating he attended a part-time design-related college but dropped out. In 1979, he joined an advertising company called POP Advertising. He made his debut as a cartoonist in 1987 when Weekly Manga Action began running his Darakuya Store Monogatari.

In August 1990, his series Crayon Shin-chan began running in Weekly Manga Action, the series started as a spin-off of the character Shinnosuke Nikaido (二階堂信之介) of Darakuya Store Monogatari. An animated series based on the comics began in 1992, and a Crayon Shin-chan boom followed the release of a 1993 animated film. For a year beginning in 1995, Usui's Super Shufu Tsukimi-San comic strip ran in the magazine Manga Life.

He and his wife raised two daughters; both had moved out of the house at the time of Usui's death.

Death 

On September 12, 2009, Usui's family reported him missing from his hometown of Kasukabe when Usui did not return from hiking in nearby Gunma Prefecture. On September 19, 2009, a body with clothes matching those described in the report filed by Usui's family was found at the bottom of a cliff at Mount Arafune in Gunma. The body was identified by dental records and family members the next day as being that of Usui. His camera was recovered and the final shot was taken from the cliff.

His funeral was held September 23 in a private service. It was attended by three thousand people.

Works
 1985 - Darakuya Store Monogatari (Darakuya Sutoa Monogatari)
 1990 - Office Lady Gumi (Ōeru Gumi)
 1990 - Crayon Shin-chan (Kureyon Shin-chan)
 1992 - Unbalance Zone (Anbaransu Zōn)
 1992 - Super Shufu Tsukimi-san
 1992 - Scramble Egg (Sukuramburu Eggu
 1992 - Kabushiki-gaisha Kurubushi Sangyō 24-ji
 1993 - Usui Yoshito no Motto: Hiraki Naotchau zo!
 1993 - Hiraki Naotchau zo!
 1993 - Super Mix (Supā Mikkusu)
 1993 - Mix Connection (Mikkusu Konekushon)
 1994 - Usui Yoshito no Buchikama Theater (Usui Yoshito no Buchikama Shiatā)
 1998 - Atashira Haken Queen (Atashira Haken Kuīn)
 2000 - Usui Yoshito Connection (Usui Yoshito Konekushon)
 2002 - Shiwayose Haken Gaisha K.K.
 2008 - Crayon Shin-chan: The Storm Called: The Hero of Kinpoko

References

1958 births
2009 deaths
Mountaineering deaths
Sport deaths in Japan
Manga artists from Shizuoka (city)
Manga artists from Saitama Prefecture